Nikola Mektić and Antonio Šančić were the defending champions but chose not to participate.

Miguel Ángel Reyes-Varela and Max Schnur won the title after defeating Alessandro Motti and Peng Hsien-yin 1–6, 7–6(7–4), [10–5] in the final.

Seeds

Draw

External links
 Main Draw

Aspria Tennis Cup - Doubles